Edward Kidd (September 9, 1849 – September 16, 1912) was an Ontario farmer and political figure. He represented Carleton in the House of Commons of Canada from 1900 to 1905 and 1909 to 1912 as a Conservative member.

He was born in Oxford Township, Canada West, the son of William Kidd, and was educated in Burritt's Rapids. Kidd served on the council for North Gower Township and for Carleton County. He owned a number of cheese factories in Carleton County. He resigned his seat in 1905 to allow Robert Borden, the party leader, to sit in the house. Kidd died in office in 1912.

His cousin George Nelson Kidd represented Carleton in the Legislative Assembly of Ontario during the same time period and a nephew Thomas Ashmore Kidd later served as speaker for the Ontario legislature.

In North Gower, the road Edward Kidd Crescent is a residential road named after him.

Electoral record

References 

 Canadian Parliamentary Guide, 1912, EJ Chambers

External links 
 

1849 births
1912 deaths
Conservative Party of Canada (1867–1942) MPs
Members of the House of Commons of Canada from Ontario
Edward